Trigonocapnos is a genus of flowering plants belonging to the family Papaveraceae.

Its native range is South African Republic.

Species:
 Trigonocapnos lichtensteinii (Cham. & Schltdl.) Lidén

References

Papaveraceae
Papaveraceae genera